Michael Melkonian (born 1948 in Hamburg) is a German botanist and professor of botany at the University of Cologne.

Biography
Michael Melkonian studied Biology at the University of Hamburg 1968–1978, receiving a Diploma degree in Botany in 1974. He remained in Hamburg to complete a doctorate in Botany (plant physiology) in 1978. In 1978 he moved, as an Assistant Professor to the Botany Department at the University of Münster, where he stayed until his appointment as Full Professor and Chair of Botany at the University of Cologne in 1988. In 1982 he was Visiting Assistant Professor at the Albert Einstein College of Medicine of Yeshiva University (Bronx, N.Y.). From 1986–1988 he was a Heisenberg Fellow of the German Research Foundation (DFG). Since 2001 Melkonian is also Director of the Culture Collection of Algae at the University of Cologne (CCAC).

Scientific contributions
Melkonian has research interests that range from cell biology,

 systematics and biodiversity, through to evolution biotechnology, and environmental biotechnology of algae, especially microalgae. To date, he has published more than 240 refereed research papers, and book articles, edited several books, among them the Handbook of Protoctista (1990), and wrote books in German ranging from General Botany (1974, 1984) to  an Illustrated Guide to Freshwater Algae (2004, 2012). Melkonian holds 15 patents and is Co-Founder of Algenion GmbH & Co. KG, an algal biotec company.

Melkonian studied the structure, function and development of the flagellar apparatus in algae and co-discovered several centrosomal proteins novel for eukaryotes (e.g. centrin, SF-assemblin). He further provided evidence that flagellar development in unicellular eukaryotes extends over more than one cell cycle generating flagella with different functions in the same cell. Through the study of the biogenesis of extracellular scales in green algae, the cisternal maturation model of intra-Golgi apparatus transport was revived. Studies on the eyespot apparatus of green algae eventually led to the identification of the photoreceptor channelrhodopsin and the emergence of the research area optogenetics. Melkonian also studied the systematics, diversity and evolution of algae with emphasis on green algae, cryptophytes, and euglenophytes but also heterotrophic protists, such as the Picozoa. Molecular phylogenetic analyses helped to identify the flagellate Mesostigma as the earliest divergence in the Streptophyta and the Zygnematophyceae as the likely sister group to the embryophyte land plants. The cercozoan photosynthetic amoeba Paulinella chromatophora was discovered as an example for the evolution of photosynthetic organelles through a second primary endosymbiosis independent of the origin of plastids. Additionally, his group developed a novel technique to grow microalgae at technical scale immobilized on Twin-Layers.

Activity in International Organizations
 1992–1994 	President, International Society for Evolutionary Protistology 
 1993–1994 	Vice-President, British Phycological Society Britain, my Life and the British Phycological Society
 1996		Organizer, First European Phycological Congress
 2002–2004 	President, International Phycological Society  
 2011–2012 	Vice-President, International Society of Protistologists
 1998–	Editor-in-Chief PROTIST

Academic Memberships
 2003 -        Corresponding Member, Botanical Society of America 
 2014 Honorary Member, Hellenic Phycological Society

Awards
 1984  Biology Prize, Göttingen Academy of Sciences
 2004 Fritz Schaudinn Award for the best original paper published during 2002 and 2003 in the journal Protist
 2014 Hans-Adolf von Stosch Medal, Section of Phycology (German Botanical Society), for outstanding service to Phycology in Germany

Publications (books)

 Allgemeine Botanik. Nach einer Vorlesung von H. Drawert
 Handbook of Protoctista: The Structure, Cultivation, Habitats and Life Histories of the Eukaryotic, Microorganisms and Their Descendants Exclusive O (The Jones and Bartlett series in life sciences)
 Der Kosmos-Algenführer

References

External links
 Publication list 1975-2014

20th-century German botanists
Scientists from Hamburg
Botanists active in Europe
1948 births
Living people
German phycologists
German people of Armenian descent
Symbiogenesis researchers
Academic staff of the University of Cologne
University of Hamburg alumni
Academic staff of the University of Münster